Riolus is a genus of beetles belonging to the family Elmidae.

The species of this genus are found in Europe.

Species:
 Riolus cupreus (Müller, 1806) 
 Riolus fontinalis Jäch, 1984

References

Elmidae
Polyphaga genera